Josef Wilhelm Klimesch (1902 in Budweis – 1997 in Linz) was an Austrian entomologist who specialised in lepidoptera. His collection is housed in the Bavarian State Collection of Zoology, Munich.

Works
Partial list,
Klimesch, J. 1950. Contributo alla fauna lepidotterologica del Trentino. Studi trent. Sci. nat. 27: 11-68, 10 pls.
Klimesch, J. 1953–1954. Die an Caryophyllaceen lebenden europaeischen Gnorimoshcema Busck-Arten. Zeit. Wien. Ent. Gesel. 38(1953): 225–239, 272–282, 311–319; 39(1954): 273–288, 335–341, 357–362.
Klimesch, J. 1961. Ordnung Lepidoptera I. Teil: Pyralidina, Tortricina, Tineina, Eriocraniina, und Micropterygina. In Franz, H., Die Nordost-Alpen im Spiegel ihrer Landtierwelt 2: 431-789.
Klimesch, J. 1968. Die Lepidopteren fauna Mazedoniens, IV Microlepidopteren. Posebno Izd. Prirod. Muz. Skopje 5: 1-203.

References

Anonym 1974: [Klimesch, J.] Mitt. Forstl. BundVersAnst. Mariabrunn, Wien 106 : 136
Gaedicke in Groll, E. K. (Hrsg.): Biografien der Entomologen der Welt : Datenbank. Version 4.15 : Senckenberg Deutsches Entomologisches Institut, 2010.

1902 births
1997 deaths
20th-century Austrian zoologists
Austrian lepidopterists
Czech entomologists
Scientists from České Budějovice